Andrei Kruchinin (born 18 May 1978) is a Kazakhstani-born Russian professional ice hockey defenceman. He was selected by the Montreal Canadiens in the 7th round (189th overall) of the 1998 NHL Entry Draft.

Kruchinin competed in the 2006 IIHF World Championship as a member of the Russia men's national ice hockey team.

References

External links

1978 births
Living people
Montreal Canadiens draft picks
Russian ice hockey defencemen
Sportspeople from Karaganda